The  is a Japanese kin group.

History
The clan claims descent from Prince Kusakabe (662–689), who was the son of Emperor Tenmu (631–686).

The family was a line of daimyō (feudal lords) which, along with the Azai clan, opposed Oda Nobunaga in the late 16th century.

The Asakura were defeated by Nobunaga at the Battle of Anegawa in 1570; the family's home castle of Ichijōdani was taken in 1573.

Asakura Nobumasa (1583–1637), nephew of Asakura Yoshikage, was allied with Toyotomi Hideyoshi and with Tokugawa Ieyasu. In 1625, he was granted Kakegawa Domain (25,000 koku) in Tōtōmi Province.  In 1632, he was implicated in a plot, causing him to be dispossessed and banished to Koriyama, where he died.

Clan Heads

Asakura Toshikage (1428–1481)
Asakura Ujikage (1449-1486)
Asakura Sadakage (1473–1512)
Asakura Takakage (1493–1546)
Asakura Yoshikage (1533–1573)

Retainer
Asakura Norikage (1477–1555)
Asakura Kageaki (1529-1574)
Asakura Kagetake (1536–1575)
Asakura Kagetsura (d.1570)
Asakura Nobumasa (1583-1637)

References

Further reading
Turnbull, Stephen (1998). 'The Samurai Sourcebook'. London: Cassell & Co.
Turnbull, Stephen (2002). 'War in Japan: 1467-1615'. Oxford: Osprey Publishing.

Japanese clans
People from Fukui Prefecture
Imperial House of Japan